The Sunday School Union was a British ecumenical organisation devoted to promoting Sunday schools in Britain and abroad.

History
The Sunday School Union had been set up on 13 July 1803 "to encourage teachers to communicate with each other, improve methods, and support the opening of new schools". Over the years local auxiliaries were set up in London and then around the country. These became "local Unions affiliated to the now termed ‘National Sunday School Union’ (NSSU)". 

The address of the Sunday School Union in the early years of the 20th century was 57 and 59 Ludgate Hill, London, E.C. The office of the National Sunday School Union was located at the same address in the late 1920s. In 1964 the latter organisation became the National Christian Education Council which in turn in 2002 combined with the Christian Education Movement to form Christian Education. 

The Canadian branch (the Sunday School Union Society of Canada) was established in Montreal in 1822.

Book series published by Sunday School Union
 Daring Deeds Library
 Endeavour Library Series
 Gift Books for Girls and Boys
 Great Biographies
 Green Nursery Series
 Heroines Library
 Little Dot Series
 Red Nursery Series
 Splendid Lives Series
 Toy Books
 Tracts for Teachers
 Wonderful Shilling Library
 Youth's Own Library

See also
 InFaith - formerly American Sunday School Union (ASSU) and the American Missionary Fellowship
 Sunday School Society
 Deseret Sunday School Union

References

External links
 London Sunday-School Union on curiosmith.com

1803 establishments in England
Defunct organisations based in England
Christian ecumenical organizations
Sunday schools